Dard Ka Rishta is a 1982 Indian Bollywood film produced and directed by Sunil Dutt, who also stars. Smita Patil, Dr. Naaz Hussein, Reena Roy and Ashok Kumar play pivotal roles. It also marked late actress, Padmini Ramachandran's (a part of the Travancore sisters) comeback to films after 12 years since Aansoo Aur Muskaan (1970)- this was her last Bollywood film to date.

Plot
Ravi Kant (Sunil Dutt) is a doctor who lives in New York with his wife Anuradha (Smita Patil), also a doctor. Anuradha is doing research into leukemia. Ravi is nostalgic about India and decides to return there when he receives an offer for a position as the head of surgery from Tata Memorial Hospital in Bombay. Anuradha wants to continue her research and does not want to go to India. Ravi returns to India after a divorce with Anuradha. Anuradha discovers that she is pregnant with Ravi's child but Ravi is unaware of the fact. In India, while treating one of his patients Bhardwaj, he meets his daughter Asha (Reena Roy). Just before his death, Bhardwaj  is promised by Ravi that he will marry Asha. Asha and Ravi are married. Asha dies while giving birth to their daughter (Khushbu). Soon after Khushboo's eleventh birthday, she is diagnosed with leukemia. On a recommendation from a fellow doctor at Tata Memorial, Ravi takes her to a hospital in New York City where Anuradha is her doctor. To cure her cancer, Khushboo must have a bone marrow transplant from a donor with matching blood group and genes. Shashi (Anuradha's son) is found to have a perfect match and he donates the marrow. Ravi discovers that Shashi is the son of him and Anuradha. In the final scene, everyone comes together at the airport when Ravi, Khusboo and Shashi are coming to India. Anuradha joins them as well and all reunite happily together.

Cast

 Ashok Kumar as Premchand Bharadwaj
 Sunil Dutt as Dr. Ravikant Sharma
 Reena Roy as Asha Bhardwaj
 Smita Patil as Dr. Anuradha
 Dr. Naaz Hussein as Dr. Najma
 Padmini  as Anuradha's Mother
 Madan Puri as Anuradha's Father
 Simi Garewal as Dr. Mukherjee
 Iftekhar as Tata Hospital Head 
 Khushbu as Ravikant & Asha's Teenage Daughter
 Sunder as Laundryman
 Johnny Lever as Joseph
Col Raj Kumar Kapoor as Khan Pathan Security Guard
 Yunus Parvez as John (Hospital Ward Attendant) 
 Satyen Kappu as Mr. Choubey (Cook)
 Tirlok Malik as Dr. Khan
 Padmini Kolhapure as Guest Appearance

Music
"Kaun Hoon Main, Kya Naam Hai Mera" - Lata Mangeshkar
"Baap Ki Jagah Maa Le Sakati Hai" - Kishore Kumar
"Ganapati Bappa Moraya" - Hariharan
"Mere Man Mandir Ka" - Chandrashekhar Gadgil
"Yun Nind Se Vo Jaan-E-Chaman, Jaaga Uthi Hai" - Kishore Kumar
"Love Is Many A Splendoured Thing" - Usha Uthup
"Baap Ki Jagah Maa Le Sakati Hai" - Kishore Kumar

Reception
The movie was a hit. Dutt said that he would donate his entire earnings from the movie to the benefit of cancer patients and autistic children in India. The movie raised awareness of the cause of cancer in India.

References

External links

1980s Hindi-language films
1982 films
Films scored by R. D. Burman
Cancer in India
Cancer awareness